The natterjack toad (Epidalea calamita) is a toad native to sandy and heathland areas of Europe. Adults are 60–70 mm in length, and are distinguished from common toads by a yellow line down the middle of the back and parallel paratoid glands. They have relatively short legs, which gives them a distinctive gait, contrasting with the hopping movement of many other toad species.

Natterjacks have a very loud and distinctive mating call amplified by the single vocal sac found under the chin of the male.

Life history

Natterjacks live for up to 15 years, and feed mainly on insects, especially beetles. At night, they move around open terrain with sparse vegetation, and their tracks can often be seen in loose sand. They move considerable distances each night, enabling the species to colonize new habitats very quickly.

Reproduction
The natterjack toad spawns between the end of April and July, laying strings of eggs in shallow, warm pools. Because the natterjack toad is often present in low numbers, its loud mating calls are important so that the sexes can find each other.

For natterjacks, pools need to have a very slight slope with sparse vegetation on the banks and in the water. As such pools are often temporary, sometimes the tadpoles die when the pools dry out. The natterjack compensates for that risk by mating over an extended period each summer. Thus, in September, the age of the juveniles can vary from one to three months.  Early breeders seldom breed again later in the season, though some females do spawn twice in a year.

Distribution
Populations of the natterjack extend through 17 European countries. In the UK, the toad is now almost completely confined to coastal sites. The natterjack is the only species of toad native to Ireland. It is found in County Kerry (Dingle Peninsula and Derrynane) and also in County Wexford, where it was introduced to a dune site.

In mainland Europe, particularly in the southern part of its range, it lives inland in a variety of habitats.

Conservation

UK
In the UK, the threatened status of the species resulted in a national Biodiversity Action Plan designating it as one of three protected amphibians. Reasons for its threatened status include:
 Loss of habitat from human overpopulation
 Deterioration and loss of lowland heaths
 Reduction in habitable coast from construction of dykes and seawalls
 Acidification of aquatic habitat from acid rain and other pollution

In England, the toad's sand dune habitat is protected by a number of national nature reserves.  For example, in the north-west, reserves are at Hoylake, Ainsdale Sand Dunes, North Walney and Sandscale Haws. In Scotland, where the species is confined to the Solway Firth,  a reserve is at Caerlaverock. In Wales, the species became extinct in the 20th century, but has been reintroduced as part of the Biodiversity Action Plan.

Ireland
To reverse habitat loss, the National Parks and Wildlife Service has created ponds for the species with some funding from the Heritage Council. The natterjack is considered endangered in Ireland. , a project involving Fota Wildlife Park and the National Parks and Wildlife Service has released 6,000 toadlets into their natural range in County Kerry.

References

Further reading
Beebee T and Denton J (1992) An evaluation of survey methods for studying natterjack toads (Bufo calamita) outside the breeding season. Amphibia-Reptilia 13: 365–374.
Beebee T and Denton J (1996) Natterjack Toad Conservation Handbook. English Nature, Peterborough. 
Herpetological Conservation Trust (2009) Natterjack Toad Species Action Plan. Bournemouth.
The Herpetological Conservation Trust (undated) Natterjack Toad Survey Guidelines. Bournemouth.
 Natural England (2011) Standing Advice Species Sheet: Natterjack toads. Sheffield.

External links

Amphibians and Reptiles of Europe
Fauna Europaea West Palaearctic distribution.
Natterjack Toad Species Action Plan (pdf). Amphibian & Reptile Conservation (July 2009) — via Internet Archive.
Natterjack Toad V 2.1. (Species Action Plan) (pdf) Cumbria Biodiversity Data Centre (April 2010).
Competencies for Species Survey: Natterjack Toad (pdf). Chartered Institute of Ecology and Environmental Management – CIEEM (25 April 2013).

 Last updated 2015-05-12.

Bufonidae
Amphibians of Europe
Amphibians described in 1768
Articles containing video clips
Taxa named by Josephus Nicolaus Laurenti